The Dreiländereck is a monument in Basel, Switzerland. It marks the tripoint where the borders of France, Germany and Switzerland meet. The France–Germany border, the Germany–Switzerland border and France–Switzerland border meet there.

Location 
The tripoint itself is located in the middle of the river Rhine. The monument dedicated to it is in Swiss territory, on a point of land approximately 150 metres (165 yards) to the south-east.

References

Border tripoints
Monuments and memorials in Switzerland
France–Germany border
Germany–Switzerland border
France–Switzerland border
Buildings and structures in Basel